The name Battle of Nisibis can refer to one of six battles fought near the city of Nisibis in northern Mesopotamia:

 The Battle of Nisibis (217) between the Romans and the Parthians
 The Battle of Nisibis (541) between the Sassanids under Nabedes and the Byzantines under Belisarius.

See also
Siege of Nisibis (disambiguation)